Ind-Suzuki AX 100 is a two-stroke, 98 cc motorcycle from Tvs-Suzuki. It was made in Japan, India and China.

Various Chinese companies like Baccio, Jiancheng, Guerrero, Ayuco or Akt copied the design and produced mechanical copies under various names such as Dayun. Launched in the middle 1990s purely for the Far Eastern commuter market, in fact, it is still made in China some 15 years on. It is the height of simplicity; a four-speed air-cooled two-stroke with piston porting and a simple carburetor. A full chain guard and simple drum brakes keep maintenance tasks simple.

Between 1990 and 2000 Suzuki motors corporation manufactured the Suzuki AX 100cc

History in India

The Ind-Suzuki Ax-100 was the result of the collaboration between the Japanese giants Suzuki Motor Corporation and the "Sundaram Clayton" (Later TVS). This was the first-ever 100cc motorcycle launched in INDIA. The first batch vehicles came as Completely Knocked Down kits due to this reason the production cost was a bit higher. It was successful during the launch period but failed to repeat the success it had in the later years. This was mainly because Yamaha has taken the Indian commuter market with the launch of Yamaha RX 100, and due to the increased production cost.

AX100